Michał Wiszniewski (27 September 1794 – 22 December 1865) was a Polish philosopher, psychologist, and literary historian.

Life 
Wiszniewski graduated from the celebrated Krzemieniec Lyceum (secondary school), where he subsequently taught for a time.

In 1831 he became a professor at Kraków's Jagiellonian University. He was a conservative activist during the Kraków Uprising of 1846. In 1848 he emigrated to Italy.
  
Wiszniewski was an epigone of the Polish Enlightenment, and at the same time a precursor of Positivism.

He authored a pioneering book on Characters of Human Minds, which is regarded as the first Polish work in the field of psychology.

Works 
 Bacona metoda tłumaczenia natury (Bacon's Method of Explaining Nature; 1834)
 Charaktery rozumów ludzkich (Characters of Human Minds; 1837, English edition 1853 
 O rozumie ludzkim (On the Human Mind; 1848)
 Historia literatury polskiej (A History of Polish Literature; vols. 1–10, 1840–57)

 See also 
 History of philosophy in Poland
 List of Poles

 Notes 

 References 
 "Wiszniewski, Michał," Encyklopedia Powszechna PWN (PWN Universal Encyclopedia), Warsaw, Państwowe Wydawnictwo Naukowe, vol. 4, 1976, p. 660.
 Polaczkówna, M., "Michał Wiszniewski, 1830-1848," Rocznik krakowski, vol. 12, 1910.
 Kadler, A., "Działaność filozoficzna Michała Wiszniewskiego," Charisteria: Rozprawy filozoficzne, 1960.
 Bańka, J., Poglądy filozoficzno-społeczne Michała Wiszniewskiego'', 1967.

1794 births
1865 deaths
Jagiellonian University alumni
19th-century Polish philosophers
Polish psychologists
Polish literary historians